Elizabeth Vazquez is an American politician from Alaska. A Republican, she was a member of the Alaska House of Representatives, serving from 2015 until 2017, after she lost her bid for reelection to Jason Grenn. She was elected to the House seat vacated by Mia Costello in 2014, when Costello was elected to the Alaska State Senate.

Vazquez represented West Anchorage in the House of Representatives. She was an unsuccessful candidate for the Senate seat held by Hollis French in 2012 and for the Anchorage Assembly in 2010. She previously served as Alaska's assistant attorney general, worked for the United States Department of the Treasury, and served as an administrative law judge. She has two master's degrees in business administration and a juris doctor.

Personal life
Vazquez was born in New York City. She is of Puerto Rican descent and speaks English as her second language. She spent time growing up in both New York City and Puerto Rico before moving to Alaska in 1983. She is married with one daughter.

References

Alaska lawyers
American politicians of Puerto Rican descent
American prosecutors
Living people
Republican Party members of the Alaska House of Representatives
Politicians from Anchorage, Alaska
Politicians from New York City
University at Albany, SUNY alumni
Cornell Law School alumni
Alaska Pacific University alumni
Women state legislators in Alaska
Year of birth missing (living people)
American women judges
21st-century American politicians
21st-century American women politicians
Lawyers from Anchorage, Alaska
Latino conservatism in the United States
Candidates in the 2010 United States elections
Candidates in the 2012 United States elections